Fritz Schär (13 March 1926 in Kaltenbach – 29 September 1997 in Frauenfeld) was a Swiss cyclist who in 1953 won the first points classification ever in the Tour de France. He also finished third in the general classification in the 1954 Tour de France. He was the Swiss National Road Race champion in 1953.

Major results 

1948
 3rd Giro di Lombardia
1949
 1st Züri-Metzgete
 1st Stage 8 Tour de Suisse
 4th Overall Tour de Romandie
1950
 1st Züri-Metzgete
 1st Stage 14 Giro d'Italia
1951
 3rd Overall Tour de Romandie
 4th Overall Tour de Suisse
1952 
 1st Stage 19 Giro d'Italia
 5th Overall Tour de Romandie
 7th Overall Tour de Suisse
 1st Stage 2 
1953
 2nd Overall Tour de Suisse
 1st Stage 1 
 4th Overall Tour de Romandie
 6th Overall Tour de France
 1st  Points classification 
 1st Stages 1 & 2 
1954
 2nd  Road race, UCI Road World Championships
 3rd Overall Tour de France
 4th Overall Tour de Romandie
 9th Overall Giro d'Italia
1955 
 1st Stage 1 Tour de Suisse
1956 
 2nd Overall Tour de Suisse
 1st Stage 7

References

External links
 

1926 births
1997 deaths
Swiss male cyclists
Swiss Tour de France stage winners
People from Frauenfeld District
Tour de Suisse stage winners
Sportspeople from Thurgau